The following active airports serve the area around Lethbridge, Alberta, Canada:

See also

 List of airports in the Calgary area

 List of airports in the Edmonton Metropolitan Region
 List of airports in the Fort McMurray area

 List of airports in the Red Deer area

References

 
Airports Lethbridge
 
Lethbridge
Lethbridge